Esraa Ali Abdul Hussein Kadhim Aljubouri (born November 17, 1995), better known as Esraa Alaseel, is an Iraqi singer-songwriter, best known for her songs "Abu Elbanat" and "Matseer Ilak Kul Chara".

Early life
Alaseel was born in Amman, Jordan. Her father was the Iraqi musician, singer, and songwriter Ali Alaseel, and her mother is from Jordanian-Palestinian descent.

References

Iraqi actresses
Iraqi actors
Iraqi film actresses
Iraqi television actresses
1995 births
Iraqi people of Palestinian descent
Iraqi people of Jordanian descent
Living people
People from Amman
21st-century Iraqi women singers
Rotana Records artists